Samuel Mercer (1799 – March 6, 1862) entered the United States Navy at a young age; he became a midshipman in 1815. He served his country during the Mexican–American War and American Civil War. He is also the father of Marine Corps Captain Samuel Mercer, Jr.

Mexican–American War
He and his crew spent the next year cruising along the Gulf Coast, providing security to American shipping in the region and helping suppress piracy. After war broke out April 25, 1846, they cruised on a blockade station off the Mexican coast, remaining there until June 17.

Civil War
As Union naval officer, Captain Mercer remained loyal to the Union during the war of the rebellion and was in command of the Union warship  stationed in Charleston Harbor at the outbreak of the American Civil War. He led a squad of four ships that had been sent to relieve the garrison at Fort Sumter, but arrived too late. On 16 May 1861 he took command of the newly recommissioned  in the Northern Blockading Squadron, and participated in the Army-Navy action against Cape Hatteras, North Carolina.

The Northern Blockading Squadron was having it share of trouble in 1861 due to the slow conversion of its ships that at times the blockade off Charleston had only a few ships, the state of the mission in this sector was so frustrating that Captain Mercer of the  lamented to his commander Rear Admiral Silas H. Stringham "Now Flag-Officer, you know as well as I do that to blockade this port efficiently with this ship alone is next door to an impossibility." How true were his words? By 10 September of that year, over one-third of the squadron's vessels lay in yards for repairs.

Post Civil War

The war ended early for Captain Mercer: shortly after the action off Cape Hatteras, North Carolina, he was relieved from active command due to age, and was serving on the Navy Retiring Board when he died in March 1862. He is buried with his son Marine Corps Captain Samuel Mercer at Laurel Hill Cemetery Philadelphia, Pennsylvania.

References

External links
 New York Times, Oct 9 1861
 New York Times, Mar 15 9 1862

1799 births
1862 deaths
Union Navy officers
United States Navy officers
Military personnel from Philadelphia
People of Pennsylvania in the American Civil War
Burials at Laurel Hill Cemetery (Philadelphia)